The Pakistan Amateur Radio Society (PARS) is a national non-profit organization for amateur radio enthusiasts in Pakistan.  It operates a QSL bureau for those amateur radio operators in regular contact with amateur radio operators in other countries, and supports amateur radio operating awards and radio contests.  It represents the interests of Pakistani amateur radio operators before national and international regulatory authorities.  PARS is the national member society representing Pakistan in the International Amateur Radio Union.

References 

Pakistan
Clubs and societies in Pakistan
Radio in Pakistan
Organisations based in Islamabad